Je t'aime, je t'aime, je t'aime is the 17th studio album by French singer Johnny Hallyday, released in 1974 on Philips Records.

Commercial performance 
The album spent several weeks at number one in France (according to the data compiled by Centre d'information et de documentation du disque).

Track listing

References

External links 
 Johnny Hallyday – Je t'aime, je t'aime, je t'aime at Discogs
 Johnny Hallyday – Je t'aime, je t'aime, je t'aime on Ultratop.be

1974 albums
Serge Lama albums
Philips Records albums